Remember Me is an album by jazz musician Frank Strozier, recorded in 1976 for SteepleChase Records.

Track listing 
All tracks by Strozier, except where noted.

"Remember Me" - 6:32
"Kram Samba" - 4:54
"Neicy" - 6:41
"Sidestreet" - 4:22
"For Our Elders" - 8:50
"Get Out of Town" (Cole Porter) - 6:32
"Hit It" (Atkinson) - 5:02

Personnel 
 Frank Strozier - alto sax, flute (3)
 Danny Moore - flugelhorn (all except 5)
 Howard Johnson - tuba (all except 5)
 Harold Mabern - piano
 Lisle Atkinson - bass
 Michael Carvin - drums

References 

1977 albums
SteepleChase Records albums
Frank Strozier albums